Erich Heckelmann (20 February 1935 – 21 June 2022) was a German politician. A member of the Social Democratic Party of Germany, he served in the Landtag of North Rhine-Westphalia from 1978 to 1980 and again from 1981 to 1996.

Heckelmann died in Grevenbroich on 21 June 2022 at the age of 87.

References

1935 births
2022 deaths
Social Democratic Party of Germany politicians
20th-century German politicians
Members of the Landtag of North Rhine-Westphalia
Members of the Order of Merit of North Rhine-Westphalia
University of Tübingen alumni
People from Altenkirchen (district)